The Bugatti Mistral, also called the Bugatti W16 Mistral, is a mid-engine two-seater sports car manufactured in Molsheim, France, by French automobile manufacturer Bugatti Automobiles S.A.S. It was revealed on 19 August 2022. The Mistral is marketed as the fastest roadster in the world. Deliveries to customers will begin in early 2024. All 99 units were pre-sold at a price of 5 million euros.

The Mistral is not a cabriolet version of the Bugatti Chiron, but a separate roadster model for Bugatti that marks the last vehicle to use the W16 engine that was introduced with the Bugatti Veyron in 2005.

Specifications
The exterior design is unique to the Mistral and is not based on the Chiron or the latest Bugatti models. It is very aerodynamic and sporty but also luxurious, the front headlights are uniquely designed with four diagonal lighting strips, the rear lights are designed as two arrows pointing to the Bugatti symbol which is also part of the lighting. Compared to the exterior, the passenger cabin was based on the Chiron, except for the gear lever design where the "dancing elephant" sculpture was embedded in amber, designed by sculptor Rembrandt Bugatti, brother of Ettore Bugatti, the founder of Bugatti.

References

External links 

Mistral
Cars introduced in 2022
Rear mid-engine, all-wheel-drive vehicles
Grand tourers
Convertibles